Chiroteuthis is a genus of chiroteuthid squid, comprising two subgenera. The hectocotylus is absent from all members of the genus; instead, a penis extending from the mantle opening is utilised. The genus is characterised by enlarged, lidded photophores present at the end of the tentacular club. Arms IV are both the longest and thickest, their membranes acting as sheaths to the retractable tentacles.

Species
Chiroteuthis sp. B2
Subgenus Chiroteuthis
Chiroteuthis calyx
Chiroteuthis joubini
Chiroteuthis spoeli
Chiroteuthis veranyi, long-armed squid
Chiroteuthis veranyi lacertosa
Chiroteuthis veranyi veranyi
Subgenus Chirothauma
Chiroteuthis atlanticus *
Chiroteuthis imperator
Chiroteuthis mega
Chiroteuthis picteti
Chiroteuthis picteti picteti
Chiroteuthis picteti somaliensis

The species listed above with an asterisk (*) is questionable and needs further study to determine if it is a valid species or a synonym.

External links
Tree of Life web project: Chiroteuthis

Squid
Bioluminescent molluscs